The Palestine Police Force was a British colonial police service established in Mandatory Palestine on 1 July 1920, when High Commissioner Sir Herbert Samuel's civil administration took over responsibility for security from General Allenby's Occupied Enemy Territory Administration (South).

Background

The Egyptian Expeditionary Force had won the decisive Battle of Gaza in November 1917 under the newly appointed Commander-in-Chief of Palestine, General Sir Edmund Allenby. Following the Battle of Jerusalem in December, Allenby accepted the surrender of the city, which was placed under martial law, and guards were posted at several points within the city and in Bethlehem to protect sites held sacred by the Christian, Muslim and Jewish religions. Following a decisive British victory at the Battle of Megiddo, the Ottoman Empire formally surrendered on 30 October 1918, leaving the British in complete control of Palestine.

Headquarters of the police in Jerusalem were initially set up in the Russian Compound, along Jaffa Road, where assistant provost marshal was assisted by the British Military Police. Initially Palestine was administered in the southern district of the Occupied Enemy Territory Administration (OETA). The Palestine Police was founded with the establishment in July 1920 of the civilian administration of the British Mandate under high commissioner Herbert Samuel.

The first police commander was Lieutenant Colonel P.B. Bramley, OBE, with the title of Director of Public Security and with the rank of Commandant of Police and Prisons. The police force at the time consisted of 18 British officers supported by 55 Palestinian officers and 1,144 rank and file, whose duties were described as:

"Besides fulfilling the ordinary duties of a constabulary, such as the preservation of law and order and the prevention and detection of crime, act as their numbers will allow as escorts for the protection of tax collectors, serve summonses issued by the judicial authorities, distribute Government notices and escort Government treasure throughout the country."

Legislative authority was granted eight months after-the-fact with Police Ordinance 1921, although the PPF's authority was never challenged legally.

The Palestine Gendarmerie
In 1926 the two Gendarmeries were disbanded, their members transferring to the British and Palestinian sections of the Palestine Police while most of the remainder joined a new Corps, the Transjordan Frontier Force.

The riots of 1929

By 1928 the Force had 2,143 officers (all ranks): 321 Jews, 1293 Muslim Arabs and 471 Christian Arabs.

In January 1930, Herbert Dowbiggin, colonial Inspector General of Police of Ceylon, was sent to Palestine to advise on the re-organization of the Palestine Police Force, and his report was submitted in May of that year. It was a highly confidential document which it was considered impossible to publish at the time.
On his advice, the British and Palestine Sections of the Police were reinforced, and deployed so that no important Jewish settlement or group of Jewish farms was without a detachment, with access to sealed armories, furnished with Greener guns. Each colony was provided with a telephone and the road network was improved to give the Police greater mobility.

The revolt of 1936-1939

During the 1936–1939 Arab revolt in Palestine, additional forces were established in Palestine by the British, including the Jewish Settlement Police, Jewish Supernumerary Police and the joint British-Jewish Special Night Squads.

The Tegart forts

Colonial Office officials in London wanted Irish-born police officer and engineer Sir Charles Tegart to become Inspector-General of the Force in 1937. He refused but joined Sir David Petrie in visiting the territory (December 1937 – January 1938) to advise on dealing with Arab guerrillas.

Tegart forts are a style of militarized police fortress constructed throughout Palestine during the British mandate. The forts are named after Tegart, who designed them in 1938 based on his experiences in the Indian insurgency. Tens of the reinforced concrete block structures were built to the same basic plan, both along the so-called Tegart's Wall of the northern border with Lebanon and Syria, and at strategic intersections in the interior of Palestine.

Many of them stand to this day, and some continue to be used as jails and police stations.

The Force during and after World War II

On 27 May 1942, the Police became a military force eligible to be deployed on military operations inside Palestine and in Syria and Iraq.

In 1944, the Police Mobile Force (PMF) was created as a fully militarized strike force, which was part of and under the command of the Palestine Police. Established with 800 British servicemen, who had been on active wartime service in Italy, North Africa, and Britain, the PMF was organized, trained, and equipped along military lines. Members wore 'battle dress' and were trained in a special training depot based in Jenin.

The United Nations Partition Resolution, 1947
By the time of the 1947 UN Partition Plan the British members of the Force alone numbered 4,000.

The end of the Mandate for Palestine
The British mandate over Palestine was due to expire on 15 May 1948, but Jewish Leadership led by future Prime Minister, David Ben-Gurion, declared the independence of the State of Israel on 14 May. Members of the Palestine Police Force withdrew with the remainder of the British in Palestine. However, the influence of the Palestine Police reached its peak after the force was disbanded on 15 May as around 1,400 policeman obtained postings elsewhere. In particular, a Special Constabulary of 500 former Palestine Police was established in Malaya after the state of emergency was declared in June 1948. Officers who served in Malaya also transferred to colonial police forces in Kenya, Hong Kong and Tanganyika. The Palestine Police Force formed the basis upon which the Israel Police was founded. Hundreds of Jewish officers of the Palestine Police subsequently joined the Israel Police. The operating procedures of the Palestine Police remained intact in the Israel Police, and the Israel Police's uniforms and rank names were identical to those of the Palestine Police until 1958.

Commandants of Police and Inspectors General
Percy Bramley, Commandant of Police, July 1920 - March 1923.
Arthur Mavrogordato, Commandant of Police, March 1923 - July 1931.
R. G. B. Spicer, July 1931 - November 1937.
Alan Saunders, November 1937 - August,1943.
John Rymer-Jones, August 1943 - March 1946.
Nicol Gray, March 1946 - May 1948.

Notable members of the Palestine Police Force

Gawain Bell, District Superintendent
Ralph Cairns, commander of CID's Jewish Section. Assassinated by Irgun in 1939.
Richard Catling, Assistant Inspector-General.
 Douglas Valder Duff, author
Roy Farran, Organiser of the "Q" Patrols. 
Bernard Fergusson, Baron Ballantrae, Assistant Inspector-General, 1946–1947
Josef Locke, Sergeant.
Kenneth Newman, Detective, Palestine Special Branch
Frederick Gerard Peake, District Commandant, Galilee
Alan Lyle-Smith, Constable, later an actor and writer under the name of Alan Caillou
Athalstan Popkess, Chief Constable Nottingham City Police
Ernest R. Stafford, Assistant Superintendent, Jaffa, 1931–1936 and writer of 'Manual of Colloquial Arabic' which was issued to the Force. Stafford joined the PP from the Arab Legion, where he served as Lt. Colonel and second in command from 1924 to 1931, with the title, El Qaim E.R.Stafford Bey. He left the PP in 1936 to join the Colonial Office as Assistant-Commissioner Palestine, where he stayed until the end of the Mandate in 1948.
W.J.Owen, Assistant Superintendent. Retired to Felixstowe, Suffolk

Notes

References
Bell, Gawain (1983). Shadows on the Sand: The Memoirs of Sir Gawain Bell. C. Hurst & Co. 
Biger, Gideon (2004). The Boundaries of Modern Palestine, 1840-1947. London: Routledge. 
Foreign Policy Association (1931). Foreign Policy Reports. Foreign Policy Association.
Horne, Edward (2003). A Job Well Done: A History of the Palestine Police Force, 1920-1948. Book Guild. 
Karsh, Efraim (2003). The Arab-Israeli Conflict: The Palestine War 1948. Osprey Publishing.  
Sinclair, Georgina (2006). 'Get into a Crack Force and earn £20 a Month and all found. . .': The Influence of the Palestine Police upon Colonial Policing 1922–1948. European Review of History, 13 (1), pp. 49–65.
London Gazette (1939). 'The London Gazette 27 January 1939', pp 604

See also
British Gendarmerie
Transjordan Frontier Force
Arab Legion

External links

Palestine Police Old Comrades Association
British Palestine Police Association
Palestine Police Flag
Medals of the State of Palestine
Guide to collections relating to the British Mandate Palestine Police, Middle East Centre Archive, St Antony’s College, Oxford.
British Mandate Palestine Police Oral History Project Middle East Centre Archive, St Antony's College, Oxford.

Law enforcement in Mandatory Palestine
Organizations based in Mandatory Palestine
Defunct law enforcement agencies of Mandatory Palestine
1920 establishments in Mandatory Palestine
Organizations established in 1920
Mandatory Palestine in World War II
Military units and formations of Mandatory Palestine in World War II